Selig ("Blessed") is a German rock band from Hamburg, which was most famous in the 1990s for a mixture of experimental 1970s rock and grunge.

Members 
Selig currently comprises Jan Plewka on vocals, Leo Schmidthals on bass, Christian Neander on guitar, Stephan "Stoppel" Eggert on drums, and Malte Neumann on keyboard.

Formation and End 
Selig was formed in 1992 in Hamburg. The band initially had Jan Plewka writing the lyrics, and Christian Neander writing the music. They released their self-titled debut album in 1994, which peaked at the 35th place in the Top 40 on the German album charts. In 1995, they released their second album, Hier, and received an Echo Music Prize in February 1995. In May 1995, the band embarked on a nearly sold out headliner tour and also appeared in several rock festivals. In 1997, the band released Blender, which was recorded in New York City. The 5 band members separated after Knockin' on Heaven's Door was finished recording. In January 1999, the band announced its dissolution, and released their Greatest Hits album in December 1999.

Comeback 
In August 2008, the band announced their comeback, and released their first single, Schau Schau, in March 2009.

Discography

Studio albums

Compilation albums

Film Score 
 1997: Knockin' on Heaven's Door (OST)

Singles

External links 
 Official German Site
 Fan Site

References 

German rock music groups
Participants in the Bundesvision Song Contest
Musical groups from Hamburg
Musical groups established in 1992